Mohsen Shadi (born 17 June 1988, in Naghadeh) is an Iranian rower.

Competitive stats

Medals
 2007 َAsian Championships (LM1x) 
 2008 World U23 Championships (LM1x) – 
 2009 World U23 Championships (LM1x) – 
 2010 World U23 Championships (LM1x) – 
 2010 Asian Games (LM1x) – 
 2011 Asian Championships (M1x) – 
 2013 Asian Championships (M1x) – 
 2014 Asian Games (M1x) –

Placing
 2008 World Championships (LM1x) – 5th place
 2008 Summer Olympics (M1x) – 25th place
 2009 World Championships (LM1x) – 12th place
 2011 World Championships (M1x) – 20th place
 2012 Summer Olympics (M1x) – 22nd place

References

 
 Biography at worldrowing.com

Living people
1988 births
Iranian male rowers
People from Naqadeh
Olympic rowers of Iran
Rowers at the 2008 Summer Olympics
Rowers at the 2012 Summer Olympics
Asian Games gold medalists for Iran
Asian Games medalists in rowing
Rowers at the 2010 Asian Games
Rowers at the 2014 Asian Games
Medalists at the 2010 Asian Games
Medalists at the 2014 Asian Games
Rowers at the 2018 Asian Games
20th-century Iranian people
21st-century Iranian people